The women's 800 metres at the 2016 European Athletics Championships took place at the Olympic Stadium on 6, 7, and 9 July.

Records

Schedule

Results

Round 1

First 4 in each heat (Q) and the next fastest 4 (q) advance to the Semifinals.

EAA : Independent athlete competing under European Athletics Association flag.

Semifinal 

First 2 (Q) and next 2 fastest (q) qualify for the final.

Final

References

External links
 amsterdam2016.org, official championship site.

800 W
800 metres at the European Athletics Championships
2016 in women's athletics